Reggie Padmasena Ranatunga (22 April 1937 – 31 May 2008) was a Sri Lankan politician belonging to the Sri Lanka Freedom Party. He was the third Governor of Sabaragamuwa, serving between June 2005 and February 2008.

Reggie Padmasena Rantunga was born on 22 April 1937 and was educated at Nalanda College, Minuwangoda and Ananda Sastralaya, Kotte. Ranatunga's interest in politics resulted in his enrollment at the Moscow Faculty of Political Science in 1960. In 1962 he joined the Sri Lanka Freedom Party and was appointed the SLFP Organizer for Minuwangoda in 1986.

At the 1989 parliamentary elections he was first elected to parliament representing Gampaha and was subsequently re-elected in 1994, 2000 and 2001.  He served as the Minister for Civil Aviation (August - October 2000) and Minister of Food and Marketing Development (October 2000 - 2001) in the Kumaratunga cabinet, and the Chief Government Whip between 1 November 2000 and 10 October 2001.

He is the father of six sons, including former international cricketers, Arjuna Ranatunga and Sanjeeva Ranatunga, along with Dammika Ranatunga, Nishantha Ranatunga, Prasanna Ranatunga, and Ruwan Ranatunga.

On 21 February 2008 he was appointed as the MP for Gampaha replacing Sripathi Sooriyarachchi, who was killed in a car accident on 9 February, however Ranatunga died on 31 May 2008. His replacement Neil Rupasinghe was sworn in on 6 June 2008.

References

Alumni of Ananda Sastralaya, Kotte
2008 deaths
1937 births
Chief Government Whips (Sri Lanka)
Government ministers of Sri Lanka
Governors of Sabaragamuwa Province
Members of the 9th Parliament of Sri Lanka
Members of the 10th Parliament of Sri Lanka
Members of the 11th Parliament of Sri Lanka
Members of the 12th Parliament of Sri Lanka
Members of the 13th Parliament of Sri Lanka
Sinhalese politicians
Sri Lanka Freedom Party politicians
Sri Lankan Buddhists